Clarence Park is a Victorian park used for sports and leisure in St Albans, England. It is still largely in its original form and has a rich variety of trees and planting. It is close to St Albans City railway station.

Overview
The park was laid out in early 1894, and comprises a  municipal sports ground and a  public park and pleasure ground. The benefactor, Sir John Maple, the owner of Maple's furniture store in Tottenham Court Road and who lived at nearby Childwickbury, donated the land and paid for the laying out, the planting and the construction of the buildings; the layout of the park itself was designed by the City Surveyor, Mr G. Ford. A striking water fountain, which can still be seen today, was donated by Lady Maple.

The park was opened on 23 July 1894 by the Duke of Cambridge, a member of the Royal family, and the event was accompanied by great celebrations in the city of St Albans.

The sports ground hosts cricket, hockey, bowls and croquet and is also the home of St Albans City Football Club.

The public park includes large grass areas used for sun bathing and games during summer, a bandstand, a children's play-park and a café. The public park is also used as the site of some of the human "Peopletown" skits on Disney Channel's preschool series Bunnytown.

Football ground 
Clarence Park is the home ground of St Albans City F.C. and it has been since their formation in 1908. It was used by St Albans F.C. and St Albans Amateurs F.C. prior to the formation of St Albans City. On 22 September 1894, the first football match at Clarence Park took place.

In the 1992-93 season, St Albans City finished as runners-up in the Isthmian League but were denied promotion due a low ground grading as a result of a diseased oak tree within one of the terraces.

Cricket ground

Next to the football ground is a cricket ground. The first recorded match played on the cricket ground came in 1875, when Hertfordshire played Somerset. The first Minor Counties Championship match played on the ground came in 1895 when Hertfordshire played Bedfordshire. From 1895 to 1997, the ground hosted 84 Minor Counties Championship matches and 2 MCCA Knockout Trophy matches.

The cricket ground has played host to two List-A matches, he first of which came in the 1984 NatWest Trophy between Hertfordshire and Somerset. The second and final List-A match played on the ground came in the 1990 NatWest Trophy between Hertfordshire and Warwickshire.

The ground also hosted a single match in the 1973 Women's Cricket World Cup, which was contested between New Zealand and Trinidad and Tobago. In local domestic cricket, the ground is the home of St Albans Cricket Club who play in the Saracens Hertfordshire Cricket League Division 2A.

References

External links

 

Football venues in England
Cricket grounds in Hertfordshire
St Albans City F.C.
Buildings and structures in St Albans
Sports venues in Hertfordshire
Parks and open spaces in Hertfordshire
Sports venues completed in 1894